KATD (990 AM) is a radio station that rebroadcasts San Francisco station KIQI. Licensed to Pittsburg, California, the station serves the Sacramento Valley.  The station is currently owned by Multicultural Broadcasting. KATD is partnered with the Oakland Athletics and broadcasts night and weekend home games.

990 AM is a Canadian clear-channel frequency.  KATD protects the nighttime signal of CBW in Winnipeg, Manitoba by reducing power and using a signal nulled to the northeast.  CBW and CBY are the Class A stations on 990 kHz.

History
In the late 1950s, the station's call letters were "KKIS."  On January 1, 1960, Kay Kis Corporation assumed ownership of the station.  The two principal owners were Len and Burrell Small (their grandfather was a former Illinois governor).  The general manager was Jerry Bassett, who previously managed radio station WISC in Madison, Wisc.

The station had the call letters KIXA on August 17, 1990.  On September 8, 1993, the station changed its call sign to the current KATD as a rebroadcast of KIQI.

Prior to 1990, this frequency was occupied by KKIS, which was playing Adult Top 40/Hot AC music as late as 1985 .

References

External links
FCC History Cards for KATD
A Brief History Of Pittsburg’s 990 AM

ATD
Radio stations established in 1949
ATD
1949 establishments in California
Multicultural Broadcasting stations